The following is a list of MTV Asia Awards winners for Favorite Artist Indonesia.

MTV Asia Awards